Lenne is river of Lower Saxony, Germany.

Course 
The Lenne rises on the northern edge of the Holzberg ridge.

The Lenne flows in a predominantly northwesterly direction through the villages of Linnenkamp and Wangelnstedt, where it passes the uplands of Elfas (max. ) to the west. After the village of Lenne the Lenne runs northeast past the hills of the Homburg Forest (max. ) and through the town of Eschershausen (with its suburb of Scharfoldendorf), from where it passes between the two ridges of the Ith (max. ; some distance off) to the north and Vogler (max. ) to the south.

The Lenne finally discharges into the Weser on the northern edge of the Vogler between the Eckberg (with its Bismarck Tower) to the north and the Königszinne (with its observation tower) to the south, immediately east of the town of Bodenwerder.

Mouth of the Lenne 
The gorge at the mouth of the Lenne is known as the Brunswick Gate ( or ). The water gap created by the Lenne opens up a gate here from the former Hanoverian town of Bodenwerder into the former Duchy of Brunswick.

The sand washed into the Weser by the Lenne at one time formed a ford, so that a trade route crossed here very early on. As a result  was founded as early as 960 on the opposite side of the mouth of the Lenne.

See also
List of rivers of Lower Saxony

References

Rivers of Lower Saxony
Rivers of Germany